Palm Beach Tan is a chain of indoor tanning facilities based in Dallas, Texas. Founded in 1990, it is the largest indoor tanning chain in the United States, with over 460 locations under the Palm Beach Tan, Palm Beach Tan Sunless, and Planet Tan brands. Sunbed tanning lotions and spray tanning lotions are the two products offered by them.

References

External links

Tanning (beauty treatment)
Companies based in Dallas
Retail companies established in 1990
1990 establishments in Texas